Souk El Souf is one of the souks in the medina of Tunis. It is specialized in the selling of wool.

Location 
It is located in the south of Al-Zaytuna Mosque, near Souk El Kmach.

References 

Souf